The 2021 Western Athletic Conference women's soccer tournament was the postseason women's soccer tournament for the Western Athletic Conference held from November 3 to November 7, 2021. The five-match tournament took place at Elmer Gray Stadium in Abilene, TX on the campus of Abilene Christian University. The six-team single-elimination tournament consisted of three rounds based on seeding from regular-season divisional conference play.  The defending champions were the Utah Valley Wolverines.  Utah Valley was unable to defend their crown, falling 3–0 against Grand Canyon in the final. This was Grand Caynon's first WAC Tournament victory in program history as well as the first victory for head coach Chris Cissell.  As tournament champions, Grand Canyon earned the WAC's automatic bid to the NCAA Tournament.

Seeding 

The top three teams from each division qualified for the 2021 Tournament.  Teams were seeded based on regular season conference records and the top seed from each conference earned a bye into the semifinal round.  No tiebreakers were required as each of the top three teams in each conference finished with unique conference records.

Bracket

Source:

Matches

First round

Semifinals

Final

Statistics

All-Tournament team

Source:

MVP in bold

References 

Western Athletic Conference women's soccer seasons
tournament 2021-22
Western Athletic Conference Women's Soccer
Women's sports in Texas
2021 Western Athletic Conference women's soccer season